The men's team Squash event was part of the squash programme and took place between November 21 and 25, at the Asian Games Town Gymnasium.

Schedule
All times are China Standard Time (UTC+08:00)

Results

Preliminary round

Pool A

Pool B

Knockout round

Semifinals

Final

References 

Men Team – Pool Matches
Men Team – Semi & Finals

Squash at the 2010 Asian Games